The short-limbed snake-skink (Ophioscincus truncatus) is a species of burrowing short-limbed snake-skink that is endemic to the coastal areas and islands of New South Wales and Queensland, in Australia.

Classification 

Subspecies
Ophioscincus truncatus truncatus (Peters 1876)
Ophioscincus truncatus monswilsonensis (Copland, 1952)

References

External links
Australian Faunal Directory Online Ophioscincus truncatus details and distribution maps.
World Wildlife Organisation List of species found in Eastern Australian temperate forests.

Ophioscincus
Reptiles described in 1876
Skinks of Australia
Taxa named by Wilhelm Peters